Ш̆ (minuscule: ш̆), called sha with breve, is an additional letter of the Cyrillic script which was used for Abkhaz at the start of the 20th century. It is composed of a sha  with the diacritic breve.

Usages 
The ш̆ is used in multiple Cyrillic Abkhaz scripts, notably in:

 the alphabet of Peter von Uslav 1862 ;
 the alphabet of Gulia and Machavariani 1892 ;
 the alphabet of Tchotchoua 1909.

Technical information 
The sha with breve can be represented with the following Unicode characters:

References 

 
 
 

Cyrillic letters with diacritics